is a Japanese footballer who plays for Fujieda MYFC.

Club statistics
Updated to 23 February 2018.

References

External links

Profile at Fujieda MYFC

1989 births
Living people
Hosei University alumni
Association football people from Tokyo
Japanese footballers
J3 League players
Japan Football League players
Honda FC players
FC Ryukyu players
Fujieda MYFC players
Association football defenders